Ridgedale has multiple meanings, including: 

 Ridgedale, Saskatchewan
 Ridgedale Center, a regional shopping mall in Minnetonka, Minnesota
 Ridgedale, Hampshire County, West Virginia
 Ridgedale, Missouri
 Ridgedale (also known as Washington Bottom Farm), the plantation of George W. Washington, a distant relative of George Washington